Camp Mont Shenandoah is an all-girls summer camp near Millboro Springs, Virginia. Its buildings and grounds are mainly in a rustic style befitting the environment. In addition to residential cabins, it has a lodge and dining hall. Activities supported include tennis, basketball, canoeing on the Cowpasture River, and archery, as well as arts and crafts. The camp was listed on the National Register of Historic Places in 2015.

See also
National Register of Historic Places listings in Bath County, Virginia

References

External links
Camp Mont Shenandoah web site

Bath County, Virginia
Mont Shenandoah
Park buildings and structures on the National Register of Historic Places in Virginia
Non-profit organizations based in Virginia
National Register of Historic Places in Bath County, Virginia
Historic districts on the National Register of Historic Places in Virginia
Temporary populated places on the National Register of Historic Places
1927 establishments in Virginia